Mary, Queen of Tots is a 1925 American short silent comedy film directed by Robert F. McGowan. It was the 42nd Our Gang short subject released.

Cast

The Gang
 Joe Cobb – Joe
 Jackie Condon – Jackie
 Mickey Daniels – Mickey
 Allen Hoskins – Farina
 Mary Kornman – Mary
 Pal the Dog – Himself

Additional cast
 Charles A. Bachman – police officer
 May Beatty – Governess
 Richard Daniels - gardener
 James Finlayson - radio station actor
 Helen Gilmore - dollmaker's wife
 Lyle Tayo - Mrs. Newman, Mary's mother
 Charley Young - dollmaker

References

External links

1925 films
1925 short films
1925 comedy films
American silent short films
American black-and-white films
Films directed by Robert F. McGowan
Hal Roach Studios short films
Our Gang films
1920s American films
Silent American comedy films